The Northrop F-89 Scorpion was a subsonic second-generation jet interceptor of the United States Air Force.  After a long development during the postwar era of the late 1940s, it began reaching operational units in the early 1950s.  A stablemate of the North American F-86D Sabre Interceptor, the F-89 replaced the first-generation Lockheed F-94 Starfire interceptor, primarily in the Air Defense Command (ADC).   It was phased out of active service in the late 1950s, being replaced by supersonic McDonnell F-101B Voodoos and Convair F-102A Delta Daggers. interceptors.

Models and service life
 F-89B Scorpion, First production model, 40 produced; first assigned to the 84th Fighter-Interceptor Squadron, Hamilton AFB, California in June 1951. All transferred to Air National Guard by the end of 1954.
 F-89C Scorpion, Second production model, 164 produced.  First assigned to the 74th Fighter-Interceptor Squadron, Presque Isle AFB, Maine in January 1952.  All transferred to Air National Guard by the end of 1954.
 F-89D Scorpion, Third (and major) production model, 682 produced. First assigned to the 18th Fighter-Interceptor Squadron, Ladd AFB, Alaska in January 1954. All transferred to Air National Guard by the end of 1961.
 F-89H Scorpion, Fourth (and last) production model; adaptation of the missile-armed F-89D to carry the new AIM-4 Falcon air-to-air missile, 156 produced. First assigned to the 445th Fighter-Interceptor Squadron, Wurtsmith AFB, Michigan in March 1956. All transferred to Air National Guard by September 1959.
 F-89J Scorpion, F-89Ds modified to carry Douglas MB-1 (later AIR-2) Genie nuclear-tipped unguided air-to-air rocket, 350 modified. First assigned to the 54th Fighter-Interceptor Squadron, Ellsowrth AFB, South Dakota in July 1957

The last active-duty USAF F-89J was transferred to Air National Guard service by the 57th Fighter-Interceptor Squadron at Keflavik Airport, Iceland in July, 1962.

The Wisconsin Air National Guard 176th Fighter-Interceptor Squadron was federalized during the Korean War, receiving F-89Cs in February 1952-while on active duty.  It was returned to state control in November 1952.   Two squadrons of the Wisconsin Air National Guard, the 126th Fighter-Interceptor Squadron at General Mitchell Field, Milwaukee and the 176th Fighter-Interceptor Squadron at Truax Field, Madison were the first ANG units to be equipped with a mixture of F-89B/Cs in September 1954.

The Northrop F-89 Scorpion reached the end of the line of US military service in July 1969 when the Iowa Air National Guard 124th Fighter-Interceptor Squadron retired its last F-89Js.

Squadrons

References

External links

Fighter squadrons of the United States Air Force
United States Air National Guard
Military units and formations of the United States Air Force by equipment